Earl Francis Walsh (June 3, 1899 – June 21, 1961) was an American football player and coach.  He served the head football coach at Fordham University in 1942, compiling a record of 5–3–1.  From 1933 to 1941, Walsh was the backfield coach at Fordham under head coach Jim Crowley, a fellow alumnus of the University of Notre Dame.  Walsh previously coached at Dowling College and at the Catholic Academy in Des Moines, Iowa. He died at a Chicago hospital in 1961.

Head coaching record

References

External links

1899 births
1961 deaths
American football halfbacks
Fordham Rams football coaches
Notre Dame Fighting Irish football players
High school football coaches in Iowa